The Torneio Heleno Nunes, was an interstate football competition organized by the Federação Paulista de Futebol (FPF) and with the official seal of the Confederação Brasileira de Futebol (CBF), which had the participation of 10 invited teams, which had not qualified for the third phase of the 1984 Campeonato Brasileiro Série A, eight coming from the Series A and two coming from the 1984 Campeonato Brasileiro Série B. The name of tournament was in honor of Heleno de Barros Nunes, former president of CBD and CBF, being the leader in the transition phase from one to the other (1979), who died on March 3, 1984.

Participants 

All clubs were invited, but the criterion for participation was the fact that they were already eliminated from the Brazilian Championship.

Format 
The championship was disputed in a single round-robin system, with the team with the most points winning the title.

Final table

References  

1984 in Brazilian football
Defunct football competitions in Brazil
Sport Club Internacional